Doris Kelenc (born 8 February 1986) is a Slovenian football midfielder who plays for USV Allerheiligen.

References

External links
PrvaLiga profile 

1986 births
Living people
People from Ptuj
Slovenian footballers
Association football midfielders
NK Aluminij players
NK Drava Ptuj players
NK Rudar Velenje players
FC Koper players
NK Zavrč players
Slovenian PrvaLiga players
Slovenia under-21 international footballers
Slovenian expatriate footballers
Expatriate footballers in Austria
Slovenian expatriate sportspeople in Austria
Slovenia youth international footballers
SV Allerheiligen players